The 2012–13 UC Davis Aggies men's basketball team represented University of California, Davis during the 2012–13 NCAA Division I men's basketball season. The Aggies, led by second year head coach Jim Les, played their home games at The Pavilion and were members of the Big West Conference. They finished the season 14–17, 9–9 in Big West play to finish in sixth place. They lost in the quarterfinals of the Big West tournament to Cal Poly.

Roster

Schedule

|-
!colspan=9| Exhibition

|-
!colspan=9| Regular season

|-
!colspan=9| 2013 Big West Conference men's basketball tournament

References

UC Davis Aggies men's basketball seasons
UC Davis